Andrew Cook is a British author, popular historian, television presenter/consultant and former British civil servant. He specializes in early 20th century espionage history. He has produced well-received biographies of Sidney Reilly and William Melville.

Biography 
Cook holds a university degree in history and ancient history and was for a time program director of the Hansard Scholars Program, University of London. He worked for many years as a foreign affairs and defense specialist with the United Kingdom government. He was an aide to George Robertson (former Secretary of State for Defense, later Secretary–General of NATO) and John Spellar (former Minister of State for the Armed Forces). The contacts he made in government later enabled him, as an author, to navigate and gain access, via the Cabinet Office, to classified intelligence services archives. In 2002 he was Headmaster of one of the UK's top preparatory schools in Bedfordshire.

Cook spent the years 1994 to 2004 researching the life of Sidney Reilly, the notorious spy. He interviewed the descendants of people who featured in Reilly's story and scrutinized over 2,000 closed or unpublished documents in 14 different countries. He was only the fifth historian to be given special permission under the 1992 “Waldegrave Initiative” by the Cabinet Office to examine closed MI5 documents that will never be released.

He was the presenter and historical consultant for Channel 4 documentaries about Prince Albert Victor (based upon his book on "Prince Eddy"), Three Kings at War and Who Killed Rasputin? – all in the BBC Timewatch strand. He was historical consultant for the Channel Five Jack The Ripper - Tabloid Myth documentary (2009; in the popular Revealed strand).

Cook has written articles on espionage history for The Times, The Guardian, The Independent, BBC History Magazine, and History Today.  He lives in Bedfordshire.

Works
Cook, Andrew (2002), On His Majesty's Secret Service: Sidney Reilly Codename ST1; Tempus Pub Ltd; 287 pages. 
Reprinted/revised as: Ace of Spies: The True Story Of Sidney Reilly (2004), The History Press; Paperback   “2nd edition”.
Reprinted as: Ace of Spies: The True Story Of Sidney Reilly, Inspiration for James Bond (2004), The History Press (Series: Revealing History); Paperback   “3rd edition”.
Cook, Andrew (2006), M: MI5’s First Spymaster; Tempus Pub Ltd; 336 pages
Cook, Andrew (2006), Prince Eddy: The King Britain Never Had; Tempus Pub Ltd; (Series: Revealing History); 288 pages.
Cook, Andrew (2006), To Kill Rasputin: The Life and Death of Grigori Rasputin; Tempus Pub Ltd; 336 pages.
Cook, Andrew (2006), To Be An Airline Pilot; Airlife Publishing.
Cook, Andrew (2008), Cash for Honours: the True Life of Maundy Gregory; Sutton; 256 pages.
Cook, Andrew (2009), Jack the Ripper; Amberley Publishing; 296 pages.
Cook, Andrew (2010), The Murder of the Romanovs; Amberley Publishing, 320 pages
Cook, Andrew (2013), Great Train Robbery: The Untold Story from the Closed Investigation Files; The History Press, 288 pages.
Cook, Andrew (2013), 1963: That Was the Year That Was; The History Press 192 pages.
Cook, Andrew (2015), Ian Fleming Miscellany; The History Press 192 pages.
Cook, Andrew (2022), The Crimes of the Gestapo: From the Closed Files of MI14; Amberley Publishing.
Cook, Andrew (Projected: 2025), The Real Goldfinger: German Spymaster Gustav Steinhauer and the Bank of England Plot; The History Press.

References

British biographers
British non-fiction writers
Living people
British male journalists
Alumni of the University of London
Year of birth missing (living people)
Male biographers